The Murray River in south-eastern Australia has been a significant barrier to land-based travel and trade. This article lists and briefly describes all of the recognised crossing points. Many of these had also developed as river ports for transport of goods along the Murray. Now almost every significant town along the river has a bridge or vehicle-carrying cable ferry nearby.

The crossings are listed in order starting from the Murray Mouth and proceeding upstream.

South Australia

As the ferries are registered as boats, each one has a name, usually named after a waterbird. As of December 2017, the ferry names are:
Narrung: Dotterel
Wellington: Heron
Tailem Bend: Rosella
Mannum large (downstream): Swan
Mannum (small, upstream): Pelican
Purnong: Kingfisher
Walker Flat: Stilt II 
Swan Reach: Water Hen
Morgan: Coot
Cadell: Albatross II
Waikerie: Quail
Lyrup: Cockatoo

In Victoria and New South Wales
The south bank of the river forms the border between these two states and former colonies, so in many cases there is a town on each side of the river.  If two towns are named in this list, the Victorian one is first for clarity and consistency.

Most of the bridges downstream of Echuca are liftspan bridges to enable paddlesteamer traffic to pass underneath even in times of high water flow.

The Hume, Newell and Sturt Highway bridges are owned and managed by the Federal Government.  The others are the responsibility of New South Wales and Victoria.

See also
 List of Australian ferries
 List of Darling River distances
 List of Murray River distances
 List of Murrumbidgee River distances
 Murray–Darling basin includes useful chart of tributaries

External links

References

Murray
Murray
 
Bridges in South Australia
Ferries of South Australia
Crossings
Lists of bridges in Australia
Lists of river crossings